Vojislav Vranjković (Serbian Cyrillic: Војислав Врањковић; born 1 January 1983) is a Serbian former footballer who played as a midfielder.

He played in Serbia, Bosnia and Herzegovina, Romania and Montenegro.

Honours
Dinamo București
 Liga I: 2006–07

External links
 Vojislav Vranjković at Srbijafudbal
 
 

1983 births
Living people
Sportspeople from Knin
Serbs of Croatia
Serbian footballers
Serbian expatriate footballers
Association football midfielders
FK Srem players
FK Obilić players
FK Glasinac Sokolac players
FK Drina Zvornik players
FK Rudar Ugljevik players
FC Dinamo București players
CSM Ceahlăul Piatra Neamț players
CS Pandurii Târgu Jiu players
FK Sloboda Užice players
CS Turnu Severin players
CSM Corona Brașov footballers
Serbian SuperLiga players
Liga I players
Montenegrin First League players
Expatriate footballers in Romania